Diego Hernández Basulto (born February 12, 1993) is a Mexican footballer who plays as a winger for Coras F.C. on loan from C.D. Guadalajara.

Career

C.D. Guadalajara
Hernández made his professional debut with the club on 27 April 2014 against Monterrey.

Loan at Coras
Hernández was loaned to Coras to gain more playing experience.

References

External links
 
 

1993 births
Living people
Footballers from Jalisco
Association football wingers
C.D. Guadalajara footballers
Atlético San Luis footballers
Coras de Nayarit F.C. footballers
Mexican footballers